Metamicrocotylinae is a subfamily within  family Microcotylidae and class Monogenea. This subfamily was created by Yamaguti in 1963

Species
According to the World Register of Marine Species, there are two genera  in this subfamily:

References

Microcotylidae
Monogenea genera